Fontaine-Chaalis is a commune in the Oise department in northern France.

On 3 March 1974 Turkish Airlines Flight 981 crashed in this commune, in the Ermenonville Forest.

See also
 Communes of the Oise department
 Chaalis Abbey

References

Communes of Oise